Syntec is a German electronic music band. They were one of the first bands to fuse synthpop and electronic body music.

The original band members were Tobias Hartwig (vocals and lyrics), Uwe Kallenbach (music, synthesizers, and programming), and Jens Meyer (keyboards). They reformed in 2016 and started recording and playing live again.

Discography

Albums
The Total Immersion (Machinery, 1994)  
Upper World (Machinery, 1995)  
The Beginning (Infacted, 2016)

Compilations
Eternity: The Best of Syntec (Synthphony, 2000)
Puppets & Angels (Infacted, 2016)

Singles
Puppets (Machinery, 1993)
It Takes A Word (Machinery, 1993)
Angel (Machinery, 1995)
Catch My Fall (Infacted, 2016)

References

External links
[ Allmusic]

German musical groups